Werd Island is the main island of the small island group Werd Islands in the westernmost part of the Lower Lake of Lake Constance just before the High Rhine leaves the part of the lake known as .  It is located on Swiss territory between Stein am Rhein and Eschenz.

History 
The Werd was already inhabited in 5000 BC, using stilt houses.  Stone tools used by hunter-gatherers in the Middle Stone Age have been found.  In the Neolithic, Werd provided an ideal place to settle. Between 1931 and 1935, the island was excavated under the direction of Karl Keller-Tarnuzzer.  Numerous items such as stone axes, arrowheads, a flint sickle, pottery shards, bone fishhooks from the Neolithic and the Bronze Age came to light.  Tools, weapons and jewelry from the Bronze Age were found.

Water levels of Lake Constance fell to an extreme low in the winter of 2005–2006.  This uncovered a large waterfront areas and some prehistoric artifacts.  A selection of prehistoric, Roman Era and medieval artifacts is on display at the entrance of the refectory on the island.  Other important finds are now housed in the Museum of Archaeology in Frauenfeld and in the local museum in Eschenz.

In 50 BCE, the Romans built a pile bridge between Rhaetia and Magna Germania via the island.  The two bridge sections had a length of 220 and 217 meters and a width of six meters.  This Roman road, known in the literature as the Rheatian Boundary Street led from the Vicus Tasgetium (Eschenz) via Rielasingen, Singen, Friedingen, Steißlingen, Orsingen, Vilsingen and Inzigkofen to a ford across the Danube at Laiz.  In Orsingen there was a junction to Pfullendorf and Burgweiler.  Near Dürren Ast, there was a further junction through the Ablach Valley to Meßkirch, Krauchenwies and Mengen-Ennetach.

Chapel 
Saint Othmar, the first abbot of the Abbey of St. Gall was sent into exile to Werd in 759.  He died on Werd on 16 November of that year.  The St. Othmar chapel on the island was erected in his memory in the 15th Century.  It belongs to the Catholic parish of Eschenz.

The island is owned by the Benedictine Einsiedeln Abbey.  It is, however, leased by the Franciscans; they live in a house attached to the chapel.

Archipelago 
Werd is the main island of a small island group.  It has an area of 1.59 hectare belongs to the ward Untereschenz of the municipality of Eschenz, in the Swiss Canton Thurgau.  The highest point of the island is 398 metres above sea level or 2 metres above lake level (396 m).

It is connected to the south bank of the river by a 125 meter long wooden bridge.

The two smaller islands in the group belong to the municipality of Stein am Rhein of Canton of Schaffhausen.  They are uninhabited and form the nature reserve and bird sanctuary Middle and lower Werdli.  Middle Werdli island has an area of 0.4 hectares; Lower Werdli measures 0.6 hectares.

The boundary between the cantons of Thurgau and Schaffhausen, follows the center line of the Rhine here.

The bridge at Stein am Rhein is generally considered to be the boundary between the Lower Lake of Lake Constance and the High Rhine. The Werd islands lie just above the bridge and are therefore inland islands, not river islands.  The Western tip of Lower Werli is about 320 meters upstream from the bridge.

Gallery

References and sources 
 Heinz Finke: Inselspaziergänge. Werd, Liebesinsel, Reichenau, Mainau, Dominikanerinsel, Lindau., 1991, 
 Karl Keller-Tarnuzzer: Die Inselleute vom Bodensee, 1935

Footnotes

External links 

 Franciscan Friars on the island of Werd
 Photo: turf maze at Werd, viewed from the air

Landforms of the canton of Schaffhausen
Landforms of Thurgau
Islands of Lake Constance in Switzerland